Carlos Israel Verdugo Concha (born 6 September 1975) is a Chilean professional former footballer who played as a forward for clubs in Chile and El Salvador.

Club career
Born in Concepción, Chile, he began his career with Deportes Concepción. Along with the club, he took part in the 2001 Copa Libertadores, a well remembered championship by the club fans where Verdugo scored two goals and the team was knocked out in round of 16 by Brazilian club Vasco da Gama. In Chile, he also played for Ñublense, Universidad Católica, Universidad de Concepción, Unión San Felipe, Provincial Osorno and San Marcos de Arica.

From 2002 to 2003 he played for Universidad Católica, winning the 2002 Apertura Championship in the Chilean Primera División.

From 2004 to 2005 he played for Universidad de Concepción, where he coincided with great players such as Esteban Paredes, the top goalscorer of the Chilean Primera División, Hugo Droguett and Luis Pedro Figueroa.

Abroad, he had a step with Águila from El Salvador in second half 2006.

In 2007, he joined Provincial Osorno and got promotion to Chilean Primera División after winning the 2007 Primera B. His last club was San Marcos de Arica in the Primera B in 2009.

International career
Verdugo made an appearance for the Chile national team in the friendly match against Catalonia in 28 December 2001. He had replaced Jaime González in the squad after González ignored the call-up.

Personal life
He was nicknamed Lulo.

He has worked for the Universidad Católica youth system as coordinator of the football academy in San Pedro de la Paz, Biobío Region.

Honours
Universidad Católica
 Chilean Primera División: 2002 Apertura

Provincial Osorno
 Primera B de Chile: 2007

References

External links
 
 
 
 Carlos Verdugo at playmakerstats.com

1975 births
Living people
Sportspeople from Concepción, Chile
Chilean footballers
Chilean expatriate footballers
Chile international footballers
Association football forwards
Deportes Concepción (Chile) footballers
Ñublense footballers
Club Deportivo Universidad Católica footballers
Universidad de Concepción footballers
Unión San Felipe footballers
C.D. Águila footballers
Provincial Osorno footballers
San Marcos de Arica footballers
Chilean Primera División players
Primera B de Chile players
Salvadoran Primera División players
Chilean expatriate sportspeople in El Salvador
Expatriate footballers in El Salvador